The Whitefish Theatre Company (WTC) is a non-profit, community-based performing arts company that performs in the 326-seat I.A. O'Shaughnessy Cultural Arts Center located at 1 Central Avenue in Whitefish, Montana.  The company, now in its 40th year, presents plays, concerts, music, dance and summer camps for local schools in the region.

WTC events are supported by grants from the National Endowment for the Arts, the Western States Arts Federation, and the Whitefish Community Foundation.

References

External links
Official website

Theatre companies in Montana
Whitefish, Montana
Tourist attractions in Flathead County, Montana